Lemery, officially the Municipality of Lemery,  is a 1st class municipality in the province of Batangas, Philippines. According to the 2020 census, it has a population of 93,186 people.

Lemery is a growing urban center in western Batangas. The municipality was named after Captain Roberto Lemery, a commanding officer of the local garrison.  He took command of the local military outpost until his death in 1856.

History

During the early part of the 18th century, adventurous settlers from Taal, northern Mindoro and southern Cavite were attracted to the vast plain near the shores of Balayan Bay because of its abundance in fish and other marine life. Salting and drying fish became their major occupation due to the great demand of salted and dried fish by the people of Cavite, Mindoro, Laguna and Batangas. People came in great numbers to join the settlers, and the village became populous. The place was first called Punta, meaning "point". In 1818, the village of Punta was converted into one of the barrios of the Municipality of Taal. It was later renamed San Geronimo.

In 1858, the barrio of San Geronimo became officially known as Lemery, after Captain Roberto Lemery, a commanding officer of the local military garrison. Captain Lemery was known for his deep ties with the community. Although he was tasked with instructing the military personnel assigned to the garrison, he went out of his way to immerse himself with the locals. He formed relationships with heads of the local church to learn the local language and cultivate harmony among the populace. When he died in 1856, the locals wished for the town to be renamed in honor of Captain Lemery.

In 1862, Lemery and its surrounding barrios were separated from the Municipality of Taal. It became a district municipality through the efforts of Candida Cesario Valenzuela, Manuel Cabrera, Policarpio Mariño and Domingo Agoncillo. Jose Cabrera became the First Gobernadorcillo of the newly created town.

The local military garrison was officially incorporated into the Guardia Civil upon the latter's creation in 1868. This newly formed organization was a gendarmerie tasked with law enforcement in the Philippines. It operated under the Spanish Army and Spanish colonial government and remained the de facto police force in the entire Philippines until its independence from Spain in 1898.

For economic considerations, Lemery was again annexed to Taal in 1904. Finally by virtue of Executive Order 1549 of the Philippine Civil Commission, it became an independent municipality in 1907.

Geography
According to the Philippine Statistics Authority, the municipality has a land area of  constituting  of the  total area of Batangas.

Barangays
Lemery is politically subdivided into 46 barangays. In 1957, the sitio of Bagong Pook was separated from the barrio of Arumahan and constituted into an independent barrio, while sitio of Masalisi was separated from Payapa.

Climate

Demographics

In the 2020 census, Lemery had a population of 93,186.

Most of the people in Lemery are Tagalogs. In recent years, there has been a noticeable increase of Visayans in some barrios or barangays. The main language spoken is Tagalog, and a significant number now speaks Cebuano. Most of the residents can also understand and speak English.

Economy 

In the Rankings of Cities and Municipalities that are based on the sum of their scores on 3 Pillars: Economic Dynamism, Government Efficiency, and Infrastructure. In 2016, Lemery ranked 75th out of 479 municipalities, with total score of 28.252921.

Lemery is a first class municipality by income classification. The primary source of income is agricultural activities, including crop production, livestock and poultry, with 30 out of 46 barangays involved in it. As a coastal municipality with 13 barangays located along the shore, fishing activities are also significant contributor to the local economy.

The municipality also serves as a provincial urban center for its surrounding rural municipalities including Taal, San Nicolas, Agoncillo and San Luis. It hosts the largest public high school in the first legislative district of Batangas, a private college (Lemery Colleges), a campus of a public university (Batangas State University)and the Batangas Provincial Hospital. Furthermore, bus lines from Manila serving the Southern Tagalog Region reach Central Batangas by way of Lemery. Vans also connect the town to and from other urban centers in the region such as Dasmariñas, Calamba and Lucena.

In February 2014, Xentro Mall Lemery, a community mall, opened in the Diversion Road, further cementing Lemery's position as a growing commercial center. In December 2017, SM Center Lemery opened.

Transportation
Lemery is accessible by bus from Manila via the South Luzon Expressway (SLEX). The Lipa-Lemery Road connects the STAR Tollway in Lipa to Lemery, passing a number of municipalities along the southern shores of Taal Lake. Lemery can also be reached from Tagaytay via the Diokno Highway. Furthermore, there are vans connecting Manila to Lemery.

Government

Elected officials:
 Mayor: Ian Kenneth M. Alilio
 Vice Mayor: Geraldine C. Ornales
 Councilors:

 Maria Hanalee V. Bustos
 Hannah Beatriz C. Cabral
 Aris Kenneth C. Punzalan
 Christopher Jones M. Bello
 Rosendo R. Eguia
 Rodolfo De Castro
 Napoleon M. Piol
 Susan B. Vidal

Health

Some of the health institutions in Lemery include:

 Batangas Provincial Hospital
 Metro Lemery Medical Center
 Our Lady of Caysasay Medical Center
 Lemery Doctors Medical Center
 Little Angels Medical Hospital

Education
Schools in Lemery include:

Elementary schools

 Lemery Pilot Elementary School
 R. Venturanza Central School
 V. Ornales Memorial Elementary School

Private schools

 Christian Knights Academy
 Escuela De Shalom
 Glorious Faith Christian School
 Maranatha Shekinah Christian School
 Philadelphia Montessorian Academy
 Saint Mary's Educational Institute
 Swiss Montessori School
 Universal Scholastica Academe

National high schools
 Ananias Hernandez Memorial National High School
 Dionisio P. Vito National High School
 Gov. Feliciano Leviste Memorial National High School (formerly Batangas West High School)
 Payapa National High School
 Lemery Senior High School - since 2016

Colleges
 Batangas State University-Lemery campus
 Lemery Colleges

References

External links

[ Philippine Standard Geographic Code]

Municipalities of Batangas
1862 establishments in the Philippines